Francisco Larrañaga Albizu, known as Txikito de Iraeta (born 14 September 1913, date of death unknown) was a Basque pelota player, winner of the 1945 1st Hand-Pelota doubles championship.

Early life
Larrañaga was born in Cestona on 14 September 1913. He resided with his family in the Iraeta neighbourhood, from which he took his nickname.

Professional career

He made his debut on 1931, but his best years as player were given between 1937 and 1942. On 11 August 1940 he played in Gros fronton the first professional hand-pelota singles championship of the history against Atano III, who defeated him with a final score of 22–8. In 1941 he reached the finale on the 1st Hand-Pelota doubles championship, along with Miguel Gallastegui, but they lost to Onaindia and Urcelay.. He participated in hand-pelota category during the 1930s and 1940s. In 1942 participated again on the hand-pelota 1st championship but lost to Gallastegui, in 1945 replaced Onaindia in the 1st Hand-Pelota doubles championship, pairing up with Lazcano due to that he suffered an injury during a regional tournament. Txikito de Iraeta and Lazcano won to Atano IV and Atano VII on the finale with a final score of 22-21 .

Championships

1st Hand-Pelota singles championship

1st Hand-Pelota doubles championship

Legacy
The fronton located in the neighbourhood of Iratea, Cestona is named after him Txikito de Iraeta Fronton.

References

1913 births
Year of death missing
Spanish pelotaris
Sportspeople from Gipuzkoa
Pelotaris from the Basque Country (autonomous community)
People from Urola Kosta